Alburnoides kubanicus is a species of freshwater fish in the family Cyprinidae. It is endemic to the Kuban and Laba River drainages in Russia.

References 

Alburnoides
Fish described in 1964
Taxa named by Petre Mihai Bănărescu
Fish of Russia